U.S. Route 1/9 (US 1/9) is the  long concurrency of US 1 and US 9 from their junction in Woodbridge Township in Middlesex County, New Jersey, north to New York City, New York. The route is a multilane road with some freeway portions that runs through urbanized areas of North Jersey adjacent to New York City. Throughout most of its length in New Jersey, the road runs near the New Jersey Turnpike/Interstate 95 (I-95). In Fort Lee, US 1/9 merges onto I-95 and crosses the Hudson River on the George Washington Bridge, where the two U.S. Routes split a short distance into New York. US 1/9 intersects several major roads, including I-278 in Linden, Route 81 in Elizabeth, I-78 and US 22 in Newark, Route 139 in Jersey City, Route 3 and Route 495 in North Bergen, and US 46 in Palisades Park. Between Newark and Jersey City, US 1/9 runs along the Pulaski Skyway. Trucks are banned from this section of road and must use US 1/9 Truck. The concurrency between US 1 and US 9 is commonly referred to as "1 and 9". Some signage for the concurrency, as well as the truck route, combines the two roads into one shield, separated by a hyphen (1-9) or an ampersand (1&9).

The current alignment of US 1/9 south of Elizabeth was planned as Route 1 in 1916; this road was extended to the Holland Tunnel in Jersey City in 1922. When the U.S. Highway System was created in 1926, US 1 and US 9 were marked concurrent through northern New Jersey between Rahway on the current alignments of Route 27 and US 1/9 Truck. In 1927, Route 1 became Route 25, and Route 1 and Route 6 were legislated along the current US 1/9 north of Jersey City. US 1/9 originally went to the Holland Tunnel on Route 25; after the George Washington Bridge opened, the two routes were realigned to their current routing north of Jersey City. After the Pulaski Skyway opened in 1932, US 1/9 and Route 25 were routed to use this road, which soon had a truck ban resulting in the creation of Route 25T (now US 1/9 Truck). South of Newark, US 1/9 was moved from Route 27 to Route 25. In 1953, the state highways running concurrent with US 1/9 in New Jersey were removed. In 1964, the approaches to the George Washington Bridge were upgraded into I-95.

Route description

Middlesex and Union counties

US 1 and US 9 begin their concurrency at a directional interchange in Woodbridge Township, Middlesex County. US 1 comes from the southwest, where it serves the city of New Brunswick and Edison Township, while US 9 comes from the south, a short distance to the north of an interchange with the New Jersey Turnpike (I-95) and the Garden State Parkway. The combined US 1/9 runs northeast through business areas as a six-lane divided highway, coming to a partial cloverleaf interchange with Route 35 a short distance after the merge. From this interchange, the road continues as a surface road with some jughandles, passing over NJ Transit's North Jersey Coast Line.

A short distance later, US 1/9 crosses into Rahway, Union County, where the road crosses the Rahway River before intersecting County Route 514 (CR 514) in the southbound direction. The highway turns more northeast, becoming known as Edgar Road in Linden. In Linden, US 1/9 passes through a mix of industrial and business areas, crossing under Conrail Shared Assets Operations (CSAO)'s Linden Industrial Track line before passing between Linden Airport and the former Linden Assembly plant used by General Motors to the west. Following the intersection with CR 615, the road enters more urbanized areas of homes and businesses. After passing near a couple of cemeteries, the highway runs to the west of Bayway Refinery before passing under a Staten Island Railway freight line that is used by CSAO. After this bridge, US 1/9 meets the western terminus of I-278 at a partial interchange with a northbound exit and southbound entrance from US 1/9. Past this interchange, US 1/9 continues into Elizabeth, where it intersects Route 439 at the Bayway Circle, which has been modified to allow US 1/9 to run straight through. At this point, US 1/9 splits from Edgar Road. From the Bayway Circle, the road turns more to the east before making a sharp turn to the north-northeast and crossing the Elizabeth River on a skyway, which ends at the intersection with Jersey Street. The road continues north through urban neighborhoods as Spring Street, passing under CSAO's Elizabeth Industrial Track line. The highway reaches an intersection with CR 624, at which point US 1/9 turns into a freeway with a local–express lane configuration, carrying two local lanes and two express lanes in each direction for a total of eight lanes. The freeway comes to an interchange with the northern terminus of Route 81, and it continues around the west side of Newark Liberty International Airport.

Essex and Hudson counties
The US 1/9 freeway continues into Newark, Essex County, with several ramps providing access to the airport as well as to McClellan Street and Haynes Avenue; the freeway also passes under the AirTrain Newark monorail line. At the north end of the airport property, the road reaches the large Newark Airport Interchange, where it has connections to I-78, US 22 westbound, and Route 21 northbound. Within this interchange, US 1/9 first has ramps to I-78, US 22, and Route 21 before turning east to parallel I-78 briefly prior to having more connections to I-78 as well as to Port Newark. Past the I-78 crossing, US 1/9 continues north, with the lanes splitting as it passes over the CSAO's Greenville Running Track, Lehigh Line, and Newark and Passaic Industrial Track at Oak Island Yard before coming to a northbound exit and southbound entrance with Delancy and South streets. The freeway continues through industrial areas as it comes to a southbound exit and northbound entrance for Wilson Avenue. Following this interchange, the directions of US 1/9 rejoin as the freeway continues northeast, with CSAO's Passaic and Harsimus Line running closely parallel to the northwest of the road. Along this stretch, the roadway comes to a bridge over CSAO's Newark and New York Industrial Track and Manufacturers Industrial Track lines. The local–express lane configuration of US 1/9 ends at an interchange with US 1/9 Truck and Raymond Boulevard that provides access to the New Jersey Turnpike (I-95). At this point, US 1/9 becomes the four-lane divided Pulaski Skyway. Trucks are banned from using the Pulaski Skyway and have to use US 1/9 Truck to bypass it.

The Pulaski Skyway carries US 1/9 between Newark and Jersey City. The skyway crosses the Passaic River into Kearny, Hudson County, where it passes over industrial areas and a CSAO railroad spur, and the Hackensack River into Jersey City. In Jersey City, the skyway passes over PATH's Newark–World Trade Center line and CSAO's Northern Branch line before heading over US 1/9 Truck and the Northern Branch line again. At the east end of the Pulaski Skyway, US 1/9 reaches the Tonnele Circle, where it intersects the north end of US 1/9 Truck as well as the western terminus of Route 139. Here, US 1/9 head north on four-lane divided surface road called Tonnele Avenue, named for local landowner and politician John Tonnelé. The road passes over NJ Transit's Morris & Essex Lines and then CSAO's National Docks Secondary line before running through urban areas.  It turns more to the north-northeast before reaching an interchange with CR 678. At this point, US 1/9 crosses into North Bergen. In this area, the road crosses over Amtrak's Northeast Corridor and coming to a channelized intersection with the eastern terminus of Route 3 that also provides access to eastbound Route 495. A short distance later, US 1/9 becomes a four-lane undivided road and reaches a partial interchange with Route 495; the only direct connection available is a ramp from westbound Route 495 to southbound US 1/9. After this, the road comes to a diamond interchange with CR 676 and CR 681. From this point, US 1/9 continues north-northeast, crossing NJ Transit's Hudson–Bergen Light Rail near the line's northern terminus at the Tonnelle Avenue station. Past this station, the road runs to the east of the North Bergen Yard and is still lined with businesses.

Bergen County
US 1/9 continues into Fairview, Bergen County, where the name changes to Broad Avenue. Shortly after entering Fairview, the route passes over the New York, Susquehanna and Western Railway's Edgewater Branch line, where it is briefly a divided highway. Turning north, the road passes more suburban areas before continuing into Ridgefield. In Ridgefield, US 1/9 becomes a divided highway prior to intersecting Route 93. The median ends after this intersection, and the road turns northeast into mostly residential neighborhoods with a few businesses, intersecting the western terminus of Route 5. Past Route 5, US 1/9 continues into Palisades Park, in a mile-long district known as Koreantown. It soon reaches an interchange with US 46.

At this point, US 1/9 turns east off Broad Avenue to merge onto US 46, which is a four-lane freeway. This freeway makes a sharp turn to the north-northeast and has partial interchanges at both ends of the 5th and 6th streets frontage roads, which parallel the freeway through residential areas and provide access to CR 501. US 1/9/US 46 continue into Fort Lee, where it has access to a couple commercial areas before encountering the northern terminus of Route 63 at a westbound exit and eastbound entrance. From here, the highway becomes a surface road that continues past more businesses and homes, angling northeast as it comes to an exit for Main Street. Immediately past this point, the road turns east and encounters a complex interchange with I-95, the eastern terminus of Route 4, and the southern terminus of US 9W. Here, US 1/9/US 46 all join I-95 and continue to the southeast along a multilane freeway with local–express lane configuration consisting of four local lanes and four express lanes in each direction, passing numerous highrise buildings as it heads east to the George Washington Bridge over the Hudson River.

New York City
At the New Jersey–New York state line on the bridge, US 46 ends and I-95 and US 1/9 continue into the borough of Manhattan in New York City and onto the Trans-Manhattan Expressway. After an interchange with New York State Route 9A (NY 9A; Henry Hudson Parkway), the US 1/9 concurrency ends, and US 9 leaves the expressway at an interchange with Broadway at the George Washington Bridge Bus Station in Washington Heights. At that interchange, US 9 turns north on Broadway, while I-95/US 1 continues east into the Bronx.

History
What is now the US 1/9 concurrency between Woodbridge and Elizabeth was first legislated as the northernmost part of Route 1 in 1916, a route that was to continue south to Trenton. In 1922, an extension of Route 1 was legislated to continue north from Elizabeth to the Holland Tunnel in Jersey City. This extension was planned to be the first superhighway in the U.S., with much of it opening in 1928. As a result of the creation of the U.S. Highway System in 1926, US 1 and US 9 were designated through northern New Jersey, sharing a concurrency from the current intersection of Route 27 and Route 35 in Rahway and continuing north on present-day Route 27 (then a part of Route 1) to Newark, then turning east, eventually following  what is now US 1/9 Truck toward Jersey City, where US 1 was to head for the Holland Tunnel and US 9 was to turn north to run near the west bank of the Hudson River. A year later, in the 1927 New Jersey state highway renumbering, Route 1 between New Brunswick and Elizabeth became part of Route 27 while the Route 1 extension became part of Route 25. In addition, the current alignment of US 1/9 between the Tonnele Circle and Fort Lee, which at the time was a part of US 9, became part of Route 1 while the approach to the George Washington Bridge became a part of Route 6.

In 1932, the Pulaski Skyway was opened to traffic, and US 1/9 were designated to use it along with Route 25. Two years later, trucks were banned from the Pulaski Skyway, and a truck bypass of the structure called Route 25T was created. By the 1930s, US 1/9 was moved to follow Route 25 south to Woodbridge instead of Route 27. By the 1940s, the US 1/9 alignment was moved to its current location north the Tonnele Circle, following Route 1 and Route 6 to the George Washington Bridge into New York City. In the vicinity of the George Washington Bridge, the route also ran concurrent with US 46. In addition, US 9 was built to connect to US 1 in Woodbridge on its current alignment (then designated Route 35) instead of using Route 4 (the current Route 35).

In the 1953 New Jersey state highway renumbering, the state highways running concurrent with US 1/9 were removed, while Route 25T became US 1/9 Truck and Route 25 between the Tonnele Circle and the Holland Tunnel became US 1/9 Business (now Route 139). In 1964, the US 1/9 approaches to the George Washington Bridge, which were shared with US 46 on the New Jersey side, were rebuilt into a freeway that became a part of I-95. Between February 2006 and November 2008, the cloverleaf interchange with Route 35 in Woodbridge Township, which was the first cloverleaf interchange in the U.S. built in 1929 when this portion of US 1/9 was a part of Route 25, was replaced with a partial cloverleaf interchange, costing $34 million (equivalent to $ in ).

In 2013, Route 1/9 was one of two main thoroughfares in Hudson County (the other being Kennedy Boulevard) that were listed among the Tri-State Transportation Campaign's list of the top 10 most dangerous roads for pedestrians in New Jersey, New York, and Connecticut. Route 1/9, which tied for the #10 place on the list, was cited for the five pedestrian fatalities that occurred on it from 2009 to 2011.

Major intersections
Mileposts in New Jersey follow the consecutive mileposts from US 1.

Related routes
U.S. Route 1/9 Truck
New Jersey Route 139, formerly designated U.S. Route 1/9 Business

See also

References

External links

Speed Limits for U.S. Route 1/9

01 9
Interstate 95
U.S. Route 001 9
Transportation in Bergen County, New Jersey
Transportation in Essex County, New Jersey
Transportation in Hudson County, New Jersey
Transportation in Middlesex County, New Jersey
Transportation in Union County, New Jersey
Transportation in Manhattan
Limited-access roads in New Jersey
 1 9
 1 9